Colonel Diana Geraldine Mary Anderson,  (born 29 January 1935) is a British nurse, midwife and civil servant.

Career
She began training as a nurse in 1952, aged 17, at the Royal Surrey County Hospital in Guildford. She later trained as a midwife, a trade she practiced in military hospitals after becoming a Nursing Officer for Queen Alexandra's Royal Army Nursing Corps (QARANC) in February 1958. She later began training others in midwifery and became an examiner of the Central Midwives Board.

After being promoted to colonel she was named Matron of the QEMH Woolwich. Other posts followed which included Deputy Medical Nursing at Headquarters BAOR. She was promoted to Colonel Commandant at the QARANC Centre in Aldershot.

Awards
She has been awarded the Royal Red Cross and, previously, the Associate Royal Red Cross.

References

External links
London Gazette Issue #48456, 18 December 1980, page 9
QARANC website

1935 births
English nurses
British nursing administrators
Living people
Members of the Royal Red Cross
British midwives
People from Portsmouth in health professions
Queen Alexandra's Royal Army Nursing Corps officers